The PFL 10 mixed martial arts event for the 2021 season of the Professional Fighters League was held on October 27, 2021. This was the finale of the playoffs for all divisions, with the winners getting $1 million cash prize.

Background
Kayla Harrison, a two-time Olympic gold medalist in judo and is seeking her second PFL championship, headlined the PFL event opposite Taylor Guardado, who emerged as an unexpected finalist in 2021. The event also featured five other finals matchups, with the winner of each weight class taking home PFL's trademark $1 million prize.

The five other championship bouts included a welterweight rematch between Ray Cooper III and Magomed Magomedkerimov, Movlid Khaybulaev versus UFC vet Chris Wade at featherweight, a heavyweight rematch between Ante Delija and Bruno Cappelozza, UFC vet Antônio Carlos Júnior taking on Marthin Hamlet at light heavyweight, and Loik Radzhabov rematching Raush Manfio at lightweight.

This PFL event featured the second MMA appearance of boxing champion Claressa Shields. Shields, who won her professional MMA debut in June, took on Mexico's Abigail Montes.

Former UFC middleweight Omari Akhmedov made a non-tournament appearance on the card. The 33-year-old Russian, who fought exclusively in the UFC from 2013 to 2021, faced Jordan Young on the night's undercard.

Results

2021 PFL Heavyweight playoffs

2021 PFL Light Heavyweight playoffs

2021 PFL Welterweight playoffs

2021 PFL Lightweight playoffs

2021 PFL Featherweight playoffs

2021 PFL Women's Lightweight playoffs

See also
 List of PFL events
 List of current PFL fighters

References

Professional Fighters League
2021 in mixed martial arts
October 2021 sports events in the United States
Events in Hollywood, Florida